Abel J. Tapia is an American politician who served as a member of the Colorado House of Representatives from 1999 to 2003 and the Colorado Senate from 2003 to 2010. Tapia left the Senate when he was appointed director of the Colorado Lottery.

Career 
Prior to his time in the General Assembly, Tapia served as elected member of the District-60 school board and as the President of the Greater Pueblo Chamber of Commerce.

On March 28, 2014 Tapia announced his candidacy for Colorado's 3rd congressional district of the United States House of Representatives. He was defeated by republican incumbent Scott Tipton.

In 2020, Tapia was a candidate for the Pueblo County Commission, running on a platform of COVID-19 economy recovery, improving Pueblo's existing jail, supporting small businesses. However, he was defeated in the June 2020 primary election by incumbent Garrison Ortiz.

References

External links
Colorado General Assembly - Abel Tapia official government website

Democratic Party Colorado state senators
Colorado State University Pueblo alumni
Hispanic and Latino American state legislators in Colorado
Democratic Party members of the Colorado House of Representatives
1949 births
Living people
People from Pueblo, Colorado